Kolos Csizmadia (born 1 September 1995) is a Hungarian sprint canoeist. He competed in the men's K-1 200 metres event and the men's K-4 500 metres event at the 2020 Summer Olympics. He set an Olympic record in the heat of the K-1 200 metres event, qualifying directly to the semifinals with a time of 34.442 seconds.  He ultimately qualified for the "A" final, and finished in 4th place overall.

References

External links
 

1995 births
Living people
Hungarian male canoeists
Olympic canoeists of Hungary
Canoeists at the 2020 Summer Olympics
ICF Canoe Sprint World Championships medalists in kayak
Canoeists from Budapest
21st-century Hungarian people